The 1993 Total International Series was a cricket tournament held in South Africa, between February 9-27, 1993. Three national teams took part: Pakistan, South Africa and West Indies.

The 1993 Total International Series started with a double round-robin tournament where each team played the other three times. The two leading teams qualified for the final. West Indies won the tournament. Pakistan finished runners-up while South Africa were eliminated at the group stage.

Matches

Group stage

1st ODI

2nd ODI

3rd ODI

4th ODI

5th ODI

6th ODI

7th ODI

8th ODI

9th ODI

Final

References

 
 Cricket Archive: Total International Series 1992/93
 ESPNCricinfo: Total International Series, 1992/93
 

International cricket competitions from 1991–92 to 1994
Total International Series
Total International Series
Total International Series
South African cricket seasons from 1970–71 to 1999–2000